Henri Clément Serveau, also known as Clément-Serveau (29 June 1886 – 8 July 1972), was a French painter, designer, engraver and illustrator. Clément-Serveau produced works in a realist manner early on, but soon became interested in the new movements. He was influenced by his friend Louis Marcoussis and experimented with Cubism, utilising geometric patterns to give the illusion of form and space. Later in his career he turned toward abstraction with a post-cubist stance. He designed banknotes for the Banque de France and produced large murals and participated in numerous French and international exhibitions.

Life
Clément-Serveau studied successively from 1904 to 1914 at the École nationale supérieure des arts décoratifs and École nationale supérieure des beaux-arts under Luc-Olivier Merson, in Paris. He began exhibiting at the 1905 Salon des Indépendants and then participated at the Salons des Artistes Français, Salon d'Automne, and Salon des Tuileries.

From 1907 to 1909 he served as a soldier in the 15th Battalion in the Vosges at Remiremont. In 1913, while still at Remiremont, the 21-year-old married Yvette Hindermeyer (then 17 years of age). There he would realize many paintings, landscapes and portraits.

In 1919 he became art director of Ferenczi & fils (Le Livre moderne illustré publisher), where he illustrated many books (seventy-eight) using the technique of woodcut. Colette was the literary director for several years. He also participated on thirty other books, and received various medals for his work: medal of honor in 1920, bronze in 1921, silver in 1926 and gold at the Salon des Artistes Français in 1929.

Thanks to his mentor Luc-Olivier Merson, he was able to design banknotes for the Banque de France. From 1956 to 1970, he designed forty-two French and foreign postage stamps. In Paris in September 1933, he married Sara Sophie Wisoume (born in Smolensk, 1903).

After a trip to Greece in 1934, Clement Serveau devoted himself to post-cubism, participating in numerous exhibitions including the Salon des artistes français. He became Knight of the Legion of Honour in 1936.

He also produced several murals and frescos including a three-by-six-meter painting for the lycée de Meaux, where he was once a student. He directed the l'École de fresques of l'École nationale supérieure des beaux-arts, and decorated the Pavillon du Tourisme at the 1937 Exposition Internationale des Arts et Techniques dans la Vie Moderne (Paris), now at the Pavillon de la Ville de Paris; Musées d'Art Moderne, Paris. In 1954 he realized a fresco for the Cité Ouvrière du Laboratoire Débat, Garches. He also executed mural decorations for the Plan des anciennes enceintes de Paris in the Musée Carnavalet.

He participated in numerous exhibitions in France, Sweden, London, the United States, and Canada.

Clément-Serveau died in Paris on 8 July 1972. He was buried in Bourbonne-les-Bains, where he owned a house on Rue Vellonne. A room in the local museum (Musée municipal de Bourbonne-les-Bains) is dedicated to him.

Examples of graphic work
 Banknote: 5 francs Berger
 Banknote: 300 francs, 1945
 Banknote: 1000 francs Minerve et Hercule
 Stamps: Listed in sale-date order

Works
 A stylized pagan scene with a huntress raising her bow, 1928
 Parades des Oiseaux, 1930
 Anémones et pois de senteur, 1932, Musée de la Société Historique et Archéologique, Haute-Marne, Langres
 Karoti Grece, Le chemin de la Fontain (Paysage Grec), 1934, Musée des Beaux-Arts de Rouen
 Aphrodite et stellio, 1934, purchase by l'Etat Français in 1935
 Route à Chio, 1935, purchase by l'Etat Français in 1936
 Rêve, 1946, purchase in 1947 by Musée national d'Art moderne - Centre Georges Pompidou, Paris
 Un dimanche de pèlerinage à la Ghraïba de Djerba (Tunisie) , 1953
 Femmes au bain
 Déesses antiques flottant sur des nuages
 Nature morte à la table et chaises
 La Favorite, Musée d'Art Moderne de la Ville de Paris, Paris, France

References

External links
 Paris, musée national d'Art moderne - Centre Georges Pompidou
 Joconde, Portail des collections des musées de France. Musée des Beaux-Arts, Rouen
 Clément Serveau, French Banknotes
 Clément Serveau, La Chemise verte, oil on canvas, 92 x 60.2 cm, Christie's Paris, 24 May 2006
 Clément Serveau, Le Bordel, oil on canvas, 90 x 95 cm, Christie's Paris, 12 December 2005
 Clément Serveau, Le pot bleu à la fenêtre, oil on canvas, 46 x 55 cm, Christie's Paris, 12 December 2005
 Clément Serveau, Déesses antiques flottant sur des nuages, oil on canvas, 138 x 175 cm, Tajan, Paris, 9 June 2011
 Agence photographique de la réunion des Musées nationaux

1886 births
1972 deaths
Painters from Paris
Modern painters
Cubist artists
20th-century French painters
20th-century French male artists
French male painters
School of Paris
Currency designers